Conor Pass or Connor Pass is one of the highest Irish mountain passes served by an asphalted road.
It is located on the R560 road in County Kerry, Ireland.

Geography 

Access to the pass 

A twisty one-lane asphalted road leads to the pass. The drive is considered one of the most beautiful in Ireland. The scenic road leading to the pass weaves its way around the sharp cliff faces and past high corrie lakes. Vehicles over two tonnes in weight are prohibited from using the road in order to avoid difficulties in passing.

Bicycle ascent to the pass is one of the most famous and difficult climbs in Ireland.

See also

 List of mountain passes

Notes

Bibliography

External links

Mountain passes of Ireland
County Kerry